Manon Simard is a Canadian sports executive currently serving as Director-general of the CEPSUM at the Université de Montréal. Named Director-general in 2020, she is the first woman to hold the position in the university's history. A former athlete on the Canadian national swim team, she had almost qualified for the 1988 Summer Olympics, ranked 19th in the world for the 100 metre backstroke. She joined the Université de Montréal in 1995 as Sports Excellence Coordinator for the relaunched Montreal Carabins.

References

Living people
Year of birth missing (living people)
Université de Montréal alumni
Canadian female backstroke swimmers
Montreal Carabins
Canadian sports executives and administrators
Pan American Games silver medalists for Canada
Pan American Games medalists in swimming
Medalists at the 1987 Pan American Games
Swimmers at the 1987 Pan American Games